Hakmey Wala also known as Chak No. 187/J.B. is a village of Tehsil Bhawana City, located near the Aminpur road. The population is predominantly Punjabi speakers, many from the Chadhar, Syed, Sihal, Noon, Lohar, Dhirkhan, Musalli, Mirasi, Kubhaar, Jappa and Gondal tribes. Hakmey Wala (Chak No. 187/JB) is naturally and ideally located in an encircled territory by canals, which is safe from floods. It has fertile soil and natural resources. It produces  wheat, sugarcane, rice, corn, cotton, beet and other crops. There is a Girls E/S located in Hakmay wala.

Chiniot District
Villages in Chiniot District